The following outline is provided as an overview of and topical guide to Saint Lucia:

Saint Lucia is a sovereign island nation located in the Lesser Antilles archipelago in the eastern Caribbean Sea adjacent to the North Atlantic Ocean.  Saint Lucia is located north of the islands of Saint Vincent and the Grenadines, northwest of Barbados and south of Martinique. It is also known as the "Helen of the West Indies" because it switched between British and French control so often it was likened to the mythical Helen of Troy.

Saint Lucia is one of the Windward Islands, named for Saint Lucy of Syracuse. It was first visited by Europeans in about the year 1500 and first colonized successfully by France who signed a treaty with the native Carib peoples in 1660. Great Britain took control of the island from 1663 to 1667 then went to war with France over it fourteen times, and finally took complete control in 1814. Representative government came about in 1924 (with universal adult suffrage from 1953) and from 1958 to 1962 the island was a member of the Federation of the West Indies. Finally, on February 22, 1979, Saint Lucia became an independent state of the Commonwealth of Nations. The island nation celebrates this every year with a public holiday.

General reference 

 Pronunciation:
 Common English country name:  Saint Lucia
 Official English country name:  Saint Lucia
 Common endonym(s):  
 Official endonym(s):  
 Adjectival(s):
 Demonym(s):
 Etymology: Name of Saint Lucia
 ISO country codes:  LC, LCA, 662
 ISO region codes:  See ISO 3166-2:LC
 Internet country code top-level domain:  .lc

Geography of Saint Lucia 

Geography of Saint Lucia
 Saint Lucia is...
 an island
 a country
 an island country
 a nation state
 a Commonwealth realm
 Location:
 Northern Hemisphere and Western Hemisphere
 North America (though not on the mainland)
 Atlantic Ocean
 North Atlantic
 Caribbean
 Antilles
 Lesser Antilles
 Windward Islands
 Time zone:  Eastern Caribbean Time (UTC-04)
 Extreme points of Saint Lucia
 High:  Mount Gimie 
 Low:  Caribbean Sea 0 m
 Land boundaries:  none
 Coastline:  158 km
 Population of Saint Lucia: 165,000  - 180th most populous country

 Area of Saint Lucia: 620 km2
 Atlas of Saint Lucia

Environment of Saint Lucia 

 Climate of Saint Lucia
 Renewable energy in Saint Lucia
 Geology of Saint Lucia
 Protected areas of Saint Lucia
 Biosphere reserves in Saint Lucia
 National parks of Saint Lucia
 Wildlife of Saint Lucia
 Fauna of Saint Lucia
 Birds of Saint Lucia
 Mammals of Saint Lucia

Natural geographic features of Saint Lucia 

 Fjords of Saint Lucia
 Glaciers of Saint Lucia
 Islands of Saint Lucia
 Lakes of Saint Lucia
 Mountains of Saint Lucia
 Volcanoes in Saint Lucia
 Rivers of Saint Lucia
 Waterfalls of Saint Lucia
 Valleys of Saint Lucia
 World Heritage Sites in Saint Lucia

Regions of Saint Lucia 

Districts of Saint Lucia (first order)
Cities in Saint Lucia

Ecoregions of Saint Lucia 

List of ecoregions in Saint Lucia
 Ecoregions in Saint Lucia

Demography of Saint Lucia 

Demographics of Saint Lucia

Government and politics of Saint Lucia 

Politics of Saint Lucia
 Form of government:
 Capital of Saint Lucia: Castries
 Elections in Saint Lucia
 Political parties in Saint Lucia

Branches of the government of Saint Lucia 

Government of Saint Lucia

Executive branch of the government of Saint Lucia 
 Head of state: Monarch of Saint Lucia,
 Head of government: Prime Minister of Saint Lucia,
 Cabinet of Saint Lucia

Legislative branch of the government of Saint Lucia 

 Parliament of Saint Lucia (bicameral)
 Upper house: Senate of Saint Lucia
 Lower house: House of Commons of Saint Lucia

Judicial branch of the government of Saint Lucia 

Court system of Saint Lucia
 Supreme Court of Saint Lucia

Foreign relations of Saint Lucia 

Foreign relations of Saint Lucia
 Diplomatic missions in Saint Lucia
 Diplomatic missions of Saint Lucia

International organization membership 
Saint Lucia is a member of:

African, Caribbean, and Pacific Group of States (ACP)
Agency for the Prohibition of Nuclear Weapons in Latin America and the Caribbean (OPANAL)
Caribbean Community and Common Market (Caricom)
Caribbean Development Bank (CDB)
Commonwealth of Nations
Food and Agriculture Organization (FAO)
Group of 77 (G77)
International Bank for Reconstruction and Development (IBRD)
International Civil Aviation Organization (ICAO)
International Criminal Court (ICCt) (signatory)
International Criminal Police Organization (Interpol)
International Development Association (IDA)
International Federation of Red Cross and Red Crescent Societies (IFRCS)
International Finance Corporation (IFC)
International Fund for Agricultural Development (IFAD)
International Labour Organization (ILO)
International Maritime Organization (IMO)
International Monetary Fund (IMF)
International Olympic Committee (IOC)
International Organization for Standardization (ISO)
International Red Cross and Red Crescent Movement (ICRM)

International Telecommunication Union (ITU)
International Trade Union Confederation (ITUC)
Multilateral Investment Guarantee Agency (MIGA)
Nonaligned Movement (NAM)
Organisation internationale de la Francophonie (OIF)
Organisation for the Prohibition of Chemical Weapons (OPCW)
Organization of American States (OAS)
Organization of Eastern Caribbean States (OECS)
United Nations (UN)
United Nations Conference on Trade and Development (UNCTAD)
United Nations Educational, Scientific, and Cultural Organization (UNESCO)
United Nations Industrial Development Organization (UNIDO)
Universal Postal Union (UPU)
World Confederation of Labour (WCL)
World Customs Organization (WCO)
World Federation of Trade Unions (WFTU)
World Health Organization (WHO)
World Intellectual Property Organization (WIPO)
World Meteorological Organization (WMO)
World Trade Organization (WTO)

Law and order in Saint Lucia 

Law of Saint Lucia
 Constitution of Saint Lucia
 Crime in Saint Lucia
 Human rights in Saint Lucia
 LGBT rights in Saint Lucia
 Freedom of religion in Saint Lucia
 Law enforcement in Saint Lucia

Military of Saint Lucia 

Military of Saint Lucia
 Command
 Commander-in-chief:
 Ministry of Defence of Saint Lucia
 Forces
 Army of Saint Lucia
 Navy of Saint Lucia
 Air Force of Saint Lucia
 Special forces of Saint Lucia
 Military history of Saint Lucia
 Military ranks of Saint Lucia

Local government in Saint Lucia 

Local government in Saint Lucia

History of Saint Lucia 

History of Saint Lucia
 Timeline of the history of Saint Lucia
 Current events of Saint Lucia
 Military history of Saint Lucia

Culture of Saint Lucia 

Culture of Saint Lucia
 Architecture of Saint Lucia
 Cuisine of Saint Lucia
 Festivals in Saint Lucia
 Languages of Saint Lucia
 Media in Saint Lucia
 National symbols of Saint Lucia
 Coat of arms of Saint Lucia
 Flag of Saint Lucia
 National anthem of Saint Lucia
 People of Saint Lucia
 Public holidays in Saint Lucia
 Records of Saint Lucia
 Religion in Saint Lucia
 Christianity in Saint Lucia
 Hinduism in Saint Lucia
 Islam in Saint Lucia
 Judaism in Saint Lucia
 Sikhism in Saint Lucia
 World Heritage Sites in Saint Lucia

Art in Saint Lucia 
 Art in Saint Lucia
 Cinema of Saint Lucia
 Literature of Saint Lucia
 Music of Saint Lucia
 Television in Saint Lucia
 Theatre in Saint Lucia

Sports in Saint Lucia 

Sports in Saint Lucia
 Football in Saint Lucia
 Saint Lucia at the Olympics

Economy and infrastructure of Saint Lucia 

Economy of Saint Lucia
 Economic rank, by nominal GDP (2007): 169th (one hundred and sixty ninth)
 Agriculture in Saint Lucia
 Banking in Saint Lucia
 National Bank of Saint Lucia
 Communications in Saint Lucia
 Internet in Saint Lucia
 Companies of Saint Lucia
Currency of Saint Lucia: Dollar
ISO 4217: XCD
 Energy in Saint Lucia
 Energy policy of Saint Lucia
 Oil industry in Saint Lucia
 Mining in Saint Lucia
 Tourism in Saint Lucia
 Transport in Saint Lucia
 Saint Lucia Stock Exchange

Education in Saint Lucia 

Education in Saint Lucia

Infrastructure of Saint Lucia
 Health care in Saint Lucia
 Transportation in Saint Lucia
 Airports in Saint Lucia
 Rail transport in Saint Lucia
 Roads in Saint Lucia
 Water supply and sanitation in Saint Lucia

See also 

Saint Lucia
Index of Saint Lucia-related articles
List of international rankings
List of Saint Lucia-related topics
Member state of the Commonwealth of Nations
Member state of the United Nations
Monarchy of Saint Lucia
Outline of geography
Outline of North America
Outline of the Caribbean

References

External links 

 Official website of the Government of Saint Lucia
  
  
 Official website of the Saint Lucia Solid Waste Management Authority
 Official website of Saint Lucia Meteorological Services
 Portal of the Saint Lucia Tourism Authority
 Saint Lucia - Simply Beautiful
 St. Lucia Pictures
 Pictures & Images of St. Lucia 
 Teaching Resources on St Lucia
 The Technical Analysis Society of St. Lucia
 Map of St. Lucia
 Photos, videos, and travelogue from St. Lucia

Outlines of countries